Badminton at the 2016 South Asian Games was held at the Multipurpose Hall SAI–SAG Centre, NEIGRIHMS Indoor Stadium under North-Eastern Hill University in Shillong, India from 6 February to 10 February 2016.

Medal summary

Medal table

Medalists

Results

Men's singles

Women's singles

Men's doubles

Women's doubles

Mixed doubles

References

External links
Official website

2016 South Asian Games
Events at the 2016 South Asian Games
2016
South Asian Games
2016 South Asian Games
2016 in Indian sport